Wayne Hardnett Jr. (born August 23, 1971), professionally known as Bone Crusher, is an American rapper and hip hop producer. He is credited as being one of the inventors of the crunk sound. In 2003, at the height of his career, his debut album AttenCHUN! reached No. 1 on the Billboard R&B/Hip-Hop Albums chart, and his debut single "Never Scared" reached the top 10 on the R&B and Rap charts. The success of the single led him to win a Source Award along with a Grammy Award nomination and an American Music Awards nomination. "Never Scared" was the theme song for the 2003 Atlanta Braves MLB, and was featured in the Madden NFL 2004 video game.

Bone Crusher was featured on the cover of PlayStation Magazine in 2004, and was also a featured character on Def Jam: Fight for NY, by EA Games. He was featured on the third episode of the Sacha Baron Cohen satirical program Who Is America?.

Discography

Studio albums

Singles

Mixtapes 
 2006: Bad to the Bone
 2009: Planet Crusher

Guest appearances 
 WAOR - All Of Me (also features Josh Mckay)
 Ying Yang Twins – Take Ya Clothes Off
 Young Jeezy – Take It To The Floor
 T-Pain – Goin Thru A Lot
 Killer Mike- Re-Akshon (also features T.I, Bun B)
 I-20 – Break Bread (prod. by Lil Jon) (also features Ludacris)
 Mariah Carey – The One (So So Def Remix)
 Kelis – Throw It Up
 Lil Skeeter – I Don't Like Dat
 Three Days Grace – Just Like Wylin (Worked on a single for xXx: State Of The Union )
 Celebrity Fit Club 4
 Fozzy (The song It's A Lie appears on Fozzy's "All That Remains" album.)
 Tango Redd (Wobble & Shake It w/David Banner)
 The Time Is Now- Sir Jinx album General Population(Feat. Ras Kass, Rodney O, Tri Star, & E Note)
 Theodore Unit – Who Are We
 Techniec – What You Say
 J Kwon – Tipsy (Remix) (also features Daz Dillinger, Youngbloodz, Da Brat and others)
 Field Mob – Deep Tonight
 Anthony B – Lighter (also features Wyclef Jean)
 Youngbloodz – Hot Heat (also features Backbone)
 Jim Crow – Flaw Boyz (also features Juvenile)
 Goodie Mob – Grindin
 A song for Xbox Live about Dead Rising
 Jennifer Lopez – Que Hiciste (Unofficial Remix)
 E-40 – Anybody Can Get It (also features Lil Jon & David Banner)
 Lisa Lopes – Bounce (featuring Chamillionaire and Bone Crusher)
 Baby D – It's Going Down (featuring Bone Crusher & Dru)
 Colt Ford – Gangsta of Love on Ride Through the Country
 Elephant Man – Pon de River
  – F tha Game Up (also features S.J. Rose)
 Bizarre – Warning (also features Anamul house)
 Playable Character on PlayStation/Xbox Video game "Def Jam Fight for New York"
 Unknown - Icey As I Wanna Be (Remix also features (Andre Lightskin) and Vander from Da Sag, Curt Cobaine 
 D Money – George Bush (Fiddle Faddle) (featuring Bone Crusher & Boondox)

Video game appearances
Bone Crusher is a playable character in the video game Def Jam: Fight for NY.

References

External links

 
 Lighter Video with Anthony B and Wyclef Jean
 Bone Crusher Interview on Soundslam.com
 [ Bone Crusher > Charts & Awards > Billboard Charts] at AllMusic.com
 [ Bone Crusher Album & Song Chart History] at Billboard.com

1971 births
African-American crunk musicians
African-American male rappers
Gangsta rappers
Living people
Participants in American reality television series
Rappers from Atlanta
So So Def Recordings artists
Southern hip hop musicians
21st-century American rappers
21st-century American male musicians
21st-century African-American musicians
20th-century African-American people